After Last Season is a 2009 American science-fiction drama film written, directed, produced, and shot by Mark Region. The film stars Jason Kulas and Peggy McClellan as medical students who use experimental neural microchips to discover the identity of a killer who has been murdering their classmates.

The film received negative reviews, with criticism being aimed at its acting, visuals, animations, and the perceived convolution of its plot. The film grossed so little in the few theatres it was shown at that the film's reels were destroyed, as this was cheaper than returning them.

Premise
Matthew Andrews and Sarah Austin are medical interns studying neurology at the Prorolis Corporation. When a serial killer begins murdering their fellow students, they use experimental chips to visualize the events of the crimes. They conclude through these visualizations that they may be able to see, and therefore prevent, the next murder before it occurs, and learn that the killer is a ghost. It is revealed at the end of the film that the events were all a dream.

Cast
 Jason Kulas as Matthew Andrews
 Peggy McClellan as Sarah Austin
 Scott Winters as Dr. John Marlen
 Casey McDougal as Anne Plaven
 Joan-Marie Dewsnap as Haley Marlen

Production
Director Mark Region has cited The Sixth Sense and The Exorcist as inspirations for After Last Season. The film was shot on 35mm film, and principal photography took place over five or six days in one house with fake medical equipment made from cardboard. According to Region, the film had a budget of $5 million, with $30,000 to $40,000 spent on filming and the majority of the remaining amount spent on the film's computer animated neural visualization sequences.

Release and reception
The trailer for After Last Season was released in March 2009, and rumors began to circulate on the Internet that the trailer was part of a viral marketing campaign by director Spike Jonze, in promotion of his then-upcoming film Where the Wild Things Are. Several websites even called into question whether or not director Mark Region is actually a real person. Lindsay Robertson of Stereogum wrote that the trailer "seems like it could only have been made in a parallel universe that irony forgot. Or written and directed by a small child."

The film premiered on June 5, 2009, receiving a limited release in Lancaster, California, Austin, Texas, North Aurora, Illinois, and Rochester, New York. Among the audience members who attended these screenings, a viewer in Rochester called the film "amazingly bad", while a viewer in Austin stated: "it was a total mindfuck. It can really only be described as a lesson in self control because at first, I wanted to leave, then I wanted to scream at the movie, then it became funny, and then it reached that level where it crawls under your skin and agitates you with the questions that rise from having been witness to it."

Film critic Scott Von Doviak wrote that the film is "intensely boring, thoroughly disorienting and so technically incompetent it achieves several deeply unnerving effects entirely by accident." C. Robert Cargill, in a review for Spill.com, referred to the film as not only the worst movie of 2009, but the worst movie of the last two decades.

References

External links

After Last Season at Rotten Tomatoes

2009 films
American drama films
2000s English-language films
2000s American films